Untamed Mistress is an American film directed by  Ron Ormond and starring Jacqueline Fontaine, Allan Nixon, Cliff Taylor, Byron Keith, and Carol Varga.

Plot
Deep in the Indian jungles, two gentlemen are searching for a beautiful woman, Velda, who was kidnapped by a group of bloodthirsty gorillas. Eventually, they finally find her, but the gorillas are determined to keep the woman within their tribe.

Cast
Allan Nixon as Arthur
Jacqueline Fontaine as Velda
Byron Keith as Maharajah Parsta
John Martin as Jack
Cliff Taylor as Cyril
Carol Varga as Rani, the serving girl
Rick Vallin as Henchman
Nelson Leigh as The Holy Man
Don C. Harvey as Kurran the Hunter
Jack Reitzen as Rajan, Rani's father
F.E. Miller as Comedian

See also 

 Ingagi (1930 exploitation film with similar premise)

References

External links

Untamed Mistress by Ron Ormond, Allan Nixon

1956 horror films
1950s science fiction films
American black-and-white films
Films directed by Ron Ormond
Giant monster films
1950s science fiction horror films
American science fiction horror films
Films shot in California
1950s monster movies
American monster movies
1950s English-language films
1950s American films